The Ministry of Science and Higher Education in Poland was opened on 5 May 2006 by the Minister of Science and Higher Education, in replacement of several parts of the Ministry of Education and Science. The Minister of Science and Higher Education administers governmental activities in science and higher education and has a budget for scientific research provided by State funds. The Rada Nauki (Science Council) acts together with the Minister, in replacement of the Komitet Badań Naukowych (Science Research Council) which was closed in 2005. The headquarters of the ministry are located at ulica Wspólna 1/3, Warsaw.

From 2020 Minister of Science and Higher Education is Przemysław Czarnek.

List of ministers

Ministers of Education and Science

External links

References

Poland, Science and Higher Education
Science and Higher Education
Poland, Science and Higher Education
Poland, Science and Higher Education